Dan Yochum (August 19, 1950 – August 26, 2020) was an American professional football player who was an offensive lineman for the Montreal Alouettes from 1972–1980 and the Edmonton Eskimos in 1980 of the Canadian Football League (CFL). He won three Grey Cups for the Alouettes and was a four-time CFL All-Star.

Yochum was born in Bethlehem, Pennsylvania, United States. He was selected in the second round of the 1972 NFL Draft by the Philadelphia Eagles after a stellar career at Syracuse University, but opted to go to Canada that season. The Eagles, which held his NFL rights, made him available in the 1976 NFL expansion draft, being claimed by the Tampa Bay Buccaneers, but he never attended their training camp or played for them.

Yochum was inducted into the Canadian Football Hall of Fame in 2004.

References

1950 births
2020 deaths
American players of Canadian football
Canadian Football Hall of Fame inductees
Canadian football offensive linemen
Edmonton Elks players
Montreal Alouettes players
Sportspeople from Bethlehem, Pennsylvania
Syracuse Orange football players
Players of American football from Pennsylvania